In philosophy, acatalepsy (from the Greek ἀκαταληψία "inability to comprehend" from alpha privative and καταλαμβάνειν, "to seize") is incomprehensibleness, or the impossibility of comprehending or conceiving a thing. It is the antithesis of the Stoic doctrine of katalepsis (i.e., the ability to apprehend). According to the Stoics, katalepsis was true perception, but to the Pyrrhonists and  Academic Skeptics, no perception could be known to be true. All perceptions were thus acataleptic, i.e. what, if any, conformity between the object and the perception of that object was unknown and, for the Academic Skeptics, could never be known.

For the Academic Skeptics, acatalepsy meant that human knowledge never amounts to certainty, but only to plausibility. 
The Academic Skeptics responded to the Stoic doctrine of katalepsis with the following syllogism:
 There are true and false impressions (phantasiai)
 False impressions are non-
 True impressions are always such that false impressions could appear identical to them
 Among impressions with no perceptible difference between them, it is impossible for some to be  and others not
 Therefore, there are no  impressions

For the Pyrrhonists it meant that knowledge was limited to the phantasiai (typically translated as "appearances," meaning a person's sensed experience) and the pathē (one's feelings). The Pyrrhonists attempted to show, while Academic Skeptics asserted, an absolute acatalepsia; all human science or knowledge, according to them, went no further than to appearances and verisimilitude.

See also
 Acinteyya
 I know that I know nothing
 Ignoramus et ignorabimus
 New mysterianism
 Strong agnosticism
 Śūnyatā
 Thing-in-itself
 Two truths doctrine

Notes

Pyrrhonism
Skepticism
Epistemological theories
Concepts in ancient Greek epistemology